David Oliver Williams (born 12 March 1926) is a retired Welsh trade union leader.

Williams was educated at Brynrefail Grammar School before qualifying as a Registered Mental Nurse at the North Wales Hospital in Denbigh.  He became active in the Confederation of Health Service Employees (COHSE), and worked for the union full-time from 1955, when he became its Yorkshire Regional Officer.

In 1962, Williams moved to COHSE's head office as a National Officer, then was successively promoted to Senior National Officer and Assistant General Secretary.  From 1977, he chaired the Whitley Council for nurses and midwives.  Also active in the Labour Party, he served on its National Executive Committee from 1981 until 1983, when he was instead elected to the General Council of the Trades Union Congress (TUC).

In 1983, Williams was elected as the General Secretary of COHSE, serving until his retirement in 1987.  In retirement, he served as an occasional adviser to the World Health Organization.

References

1926 births
Living people
General Secretaries of the Confederation of Health Service Employees
Members of the General Council of the Trades Union Congress
Welsh trade unionists